Alberto Amancio Beltrán (Palo Blanco, La Romana, 5 May 1923 - Connecticut, 2 February 1997) was a Dominican singer, known as "El Negrito del Batey", after his first signature tune. He mainly sang in the genres of bolero, son montuno, mambo, merengue, and guaracha. After recording in the Dominican Republic with René Hernandez' orchestra, he moved to New York City in 1961 to work with La Sonora Matancera.

Discography
El Negrito Del Batey Alberto Beltrán, Conjunto Casino -   	Panart		1958		
Regresa	Seeco Records		1960		
Caliente y Sabroso Alberto Beltrán con Daniel Santos y Bienvenido Granda -   	Tropical  	1960		
En Viaje	Tropical TRLP-5088	1960		
Nuevo Triunfo  Alberto Beltrán con René Hernandez y Su Orquesta* - 	Seeco Records		1961		
El Único  Alberto Beltrán con La Sonora Matancera y Otros -   Tropical  		1961		
La Voz Del Caribe, Musart	DM 1138	1965		
Quiero Saber    	Tropical  1966		
Canta Sus Mejores Exitos Alberto Beltrán con La Sonora Matancera -  Seeco Records		1970
Merengues Con Mariachi Alberto Beltrán Con El Mariachi México de Pepe Villa*  Discos Gas	G-4084 1973

References

1923 births
1997 deaths
20th-century Dominican Republic male singers